Kamani is a surname and a common male name in India, Iran, East Africa, and the Americas. Notable people with the surname include:

Bayano Kamani, a Panamanian hurdler 
Mahmud Kamani (born 1964), British businessman, co-founder of Boohoo.com
Pobiti Kamani
Ramji H. Kamani, Indian industrialist from Gujarat
Titus Kamani, Tanzanian politician
Umar Kamani (born 1988), British businessman, son of Mahmud

See also
Kamani (disambiguation)